By the arrangements of the Canadian federation, the Canadian monarchy operates in Saskatchewan as the core of the province's Westminster-style parliamentary democracy. As such, the Crown within Saskatchewan's jurisdiction is referred to as the Crown in right of Saskatchewan, His Majesty in right of Saskatchewan, or His Majesty the King in right of Saskatchewan. The Constitution Act, 1867, however, leaves many royal duties in Saskatchewan specifically assigned to the sovereign's viceroy, the Lieutenant Governor of Saskatchewan, whose direct participation in governance is limited by the conventional stipulations of constitutional monarchy.

Constitutional role

The role of the Crown is both legal and practical; it functions in Saskatchewan in the same way it does in all of Canada's other provinces, being the centre of a constitutional construct in which the institutions of government acting under the sovereign's authority share the power of the whole. It is thus the foundation of the executive, legislative, and judicial branches of the province's government. The —is represented and  duties carried out by the Lieutenant Governor of Saskatchewan, whose direct participation in governance is limited by the conventional stipulations of constitutional monarchy, with most related powers entrusted for exercise by the elected parliamentarians, the ministers of the Crown generally drawn from amongst them, and the judges and justices of the peace. The Crown today primarily functions as a guarantor of continuous and stable governance and a nonpartisan safeguard against the abuse of power. This arrangement began with the granting of Royal Assent to the 1905 Saskatchewan Act, and continued an unbroken line of monarchical government extending back to the mid 17th century.

Royal associations

Those in the Royal Family perform ceremonial duties when on a tour of the province; the royal persons do not receive any personal income for their service, only the costs associated with the exercise of these obligations are funded by both the Canadian and Saskatchewan Crowns in their respective councils. Monuments around Saskatchewan mark some of those visits, while others honour a royal personage or event. Further, Saskatchewan's monarchical status is illustrated by royal names applied regions, communities, schools, and buildings, many of which may also have a specific history with a member or members of the Royal Family. Gifts are also sometimes offered from the people of Saskatchewan, via the Office of Protocol and Honours, to a royal person to mark a visit or an important milestone; for instance, Princess Elizabeth, Duchess of Edinburgh (later Queen Elizabeth II), was in 1951 given two paintings by Robert Newton Hurley and works were commissioned from Catherine Perehudoff for Queen Elizabeth The Queen Mother. Unofficial gifts are also offered on various occasions, including a carload of locally milled flour from Yorkton for Princess Elizabeth on her marriage in 1947, and Royal Family members and viceroys have been conferred honorary degrees by Saskatchewan universities.

Associations also exist between the Crown and many private organizations within the province; these may have been founded by a Royal Charter, received a royal prefix, and/or been honoured with the patronage of a member of the Royal Family. Examples include the Globe Theatre, which is under the patronage of Prince Edward, Earl of Wessex, and the Royal Saskatchewan Museum, which received its royal prefix from Queen Elizabeth II in 1993. At the various levels of education within Saskatchewan, there also exist a number of scholarships and academic awards either established by or named for members of the Royal Family, such as the Queen Elizabeth II Scholarship in Parliamentary Studies and the Queen Elizabeth II Centennial Aboriginal Scholarship.

The main symbol of the monarchy is the sovereign self,  image (in portrait or effigy) thus being used to signify government authority. A royal cypher, crown, or the provincial arms (known as the Arms of  Majesty in right of Saskatchewan) may also illustrate the monarchy as the locus of authority, without referring to any specific monarch. Additionally, though the monarch does not form a part of the constitutions of Saskatchewan's honours, they do stem from the Crown as the fount of honour, and so bear on the insignia symbols of the sovereign. The  or others in  family may bestow awards in person: in 2004, the Princess Royal presented to 25 recipients the Saskatchewan Protective Services Medal, marking the first time a member of the Royal Family had presented a provincial honour in Canada, and, when the Queen was in the province in 2005, she appointed Saskatchewan citizens to the Royal Victorian Order. Similarly, under the authority of the Queen in right of Saskatchewan, other members of the Royal Family have received Saskatchewan honours.

History

In 1882, Princess Louise, Duchess of Argyll, and her husband, the then Governor General of Canada, were the first members of the Royal Family to pass through what would become Saskatchewan. During a stop at the not yet named territorial capital, in the dining room of the Royal Train, Princess Louise named the new community Regina, after her mother, Queen Victoria.

Princess Margaret, Countess of Snowdon, presided over the celebrations of the 75th anniversary of Saskatchewan's entry into Confederation and Princess Anne marked Regina's centennial. Queen Elizabeth II presided over the main events in 2005 celebrating the 100th anniversary of Saskatchewan's creation.

In 2022, Saskatchewan instituted a provincial Platinum Jubilee medal to mark the Queen's seventy years on the Canadian throne; the first time in Canada's history that a royal occasion was commemorated on provincial medals.

See also
 Royal visits to Saskatchewan
 The Canadian Crown in Saskatoon
 University of Saskatchewan > Royal connections
 Symbols of Saskatchewan
 Monarchy

Notes

References

Further reading

External links
 
 
 
 
 
 
  South Saskatchewan Branch of the Monarchist League of Canada
 Queen Elizabeth II's Saskatchewan connection at CBC

Saskatchewan, Monarchy in
Politics of Saskatchewan